Raúl González Rodríguez (born February 29, 1952) is a Mexican former race walker. He set the world record in the 50-kilometres racewalk twice in 1978 (3:45:52 and 3:41:20). As of October 2011, it still was the North American record.

Gonzalez won the 50 km racewalk at the IAAF World Race Walking Cup in 1977, 1981 and 1983. He also won a silver medal in 20 km and a gold in 50 km at the 1984 Olympics in Los Angeles. Gonzalez set an Olympic record winning the 50-kilometres event at 3 hours, 47 minutes, 26 seconds.

Gonzalez was a member of the national racewalk team that received Mexico's National Sports Prize in 1977; he received the prize individually in 1978. From 1988 to 1994 he was Director of National Sports Commission of Mexico, and from 2002 to 2004 executive president of the Mexican Professional Baseball League.

Achievements

References

External links 
 
 

 

1952 births
Living people
Athletes (track and field) at the 1972 Summer Olympics
Athletes (track and field) at the 1976 Summer Olympics
Athletes (track and field) at the 1980 Summer Olympics
Athletes (track and field) at the 1984 Summer Olympics
Athletes (track and field) at the 1979 Pan American Games
Athletes (track and field) at the 1983 Pan American Games
Athletes (track and field) at the 1987 Pan American Games
Mexican male racewalkers
Olympic athletes of Mexico
Olympic gold medalists for Mexico
Olympic silver medalists for Mexico
World record setters in athletics (track and field)
Sportspeople from Nuevo León
Pan American Games gold medalists for Mexico
Pan American Games silver medalists for Mexico
Pan American Games medalists in athletics (track and field)
Olympic gold medalists in athletics (track and field)
Olympic silver medalists in athletics (track and field)
Competitors at the 1974 Central American and Caribbean Games
Competitors at the 1978 Central American and Caribbean Games
Competitors at the 1982 Central American and Caribbean Games
Central American and Caribbean Games gold medalists for Mexico
Central American and Caribbean Games silver medalists for Mexico
World Athletics Race Walking Team Championships winners
Medalists at the 1984 Summer Olympics
Central American and Caribbean Games medalists in athletics
Medalists at the 1979 Pan American Games
Medalists at the 1983 Pan American Games
Medalists at the 1987 Pan American Games
20th-century Mexican people